Zanthoxylum negrilense is a species of plant in the family Rutaceae. It is endemic to Jamaica.

References

Flora of Jamaica
negrilense
Endangered plants
Endemic flora of Jamaica
Taxonomy articles created by Polbot
Plants described in 1917